Jeyhun Nuriyev (born on 30 March 2001 in Azerbaijan) is an Azerbaijani professional footballer who plays as a midfielder for Sabah in the Azerbaijan Premier League.

Career

Club
On 22 August 2020, Nuriyev made his debut in the Azerbaijan Premier League for Sabah match against Qarabağ.

References

External links
 

2001 births
Living people
Association football midfielders
Azerbaijani footballers
Azerbaijan Premier League players
Sabah FC (Azerbaijan) players